Phaenopsectra is a genus of non-biting midges in the subfamily Chironominae of the bloodworm family Chironomidae.

Species
P. albescens (Townes, 1945)
P. dyari (Townes, 1945)
P. flavipes (Meigen, 1818)
P. incompta (Zetterstedt, 1838)
P. obediens (Johannsen, 1905)
P. pilicellata Grodhaus, 1976
P. profusa (Townes, 1945)
P. punctipes (Wiedemann, 1817)
P. vittata (Townes, 1945)

References

Chironomidae
Nematoceran flies of Europe
Chironomoidea genera